Castilenti (locally Castilinde) is a town and comune in Teramo province in the Abruzzo region of eastern Italy.

References

Cities and towns in Abruzzo